Fresnéu is one of six parishes (administrative divisions)  in Cabranes, a municipality within the province and autonomous community of Asturias, in northern Spain. 

Villages
 Camás
 Candones
 La Curciada
 Fresnéu
 Fresnu
 Iría
 Naveda 
 Piñera 
 Viella

References  

Parishes in Cabranes